Thomas Everett Thompson PhD DSc FZS (3 November 1933 – 1 January 1990) was a British malacologist and embryologist, known for his extensive studies on opisthobranch molluscs.

Thompson graduated from the University of Wales, Bangor, in 1954 and earned his PhD from the same university for research on dorid nudibranchs. He was awarded a D.Sc. in 1964. He was a Leverhulme Research Fellow, University of Liverpool, and a lecturer in zoology at University College of South Wales and Monmouthshire, before taking up a lectureship in zoology at the University of Bristol in 1963. He authored more than 115 scientific papers and books, including a two-volume Ray Society monograph on British opisthobranch molluscs.

Taxa named after T.E. Thompson 
 Chromodoris thompsoni Rudman, 1983
 Colpodaspis thompsoni G.H. Brown, 1979
 Cuthona thompsoni Garcia, Lopez-González & Garcia-Gomez, 1991
 Elysia thompsoni Jensen, 1993
 Loy thompsoni Millen & Nybakken, 1991
 Pseudovermis thompsoni Salvini-Plawen, 1991
 Glaucus thompsoni Churchill, Valdes & Foighil 2014

References

1933 births
1990 deaths
British malacologists
British embryologists
Academics of the University of Bristol
20th-century British zoologists